The Revenge of the Woman in Black is a Canadian crime comedy film, directed by Roger Cantin and released in 1997. A sequel to his 1991 film Four Stiffs and a Trombone (L'assassin jouait du trombone), the film revisits Augustin Marleau (Germain Houde), now a successful comedian who is framed for murder by his manager Édouard Elkin (Marc Labrèche).

The cast also includes Raymond Bouchard, Normand Lévesque, France Castel, Jean-Guy Bouchard and Micheline Lanctôt.

Francesca Chamberland received a Genie Award nomination for Best Costume Design at the 18th Genie Awards.

References

External links
 

1997 films
Canadian crime comedy films
Films shot in Montreal
Films set in Montreal
1990s crime comedy films
French-language Canadian films
1990s Canadian films